The Mob may refer to:

Crime groups
 Italian organized crime
 The Italian-American Mafia, an organized crime secret society
 The Sicilian Mafia
 Irish Mob, the first organized crime group for which the term was used
 Organized crime, in general

Film, TV and entertainment
 The Mob (film), a 1951 American film
 The Mob (company), a film company
 The Mob, the 100 unsuspecting antagonists in the TV game show 1 vs. 100
 The Mob, the first book in the series Feather and Bone: The Crow Chronicles

Music

Bands
The Mob (British punk band)
The Mob (American hardcore band), a punk rock band active 1980–91, reunited in 2011
The Mob (American rock band), a rock group that produced a single album in 2005
The Mob (Chicago band), an American rock, rhythm and blues show band formed in 1966, or their eponymous album
Queensrÿche, originally The Mob, an American progressive metal band

See also
 The MOBB, a 2016 album by MOBB
 MOB (disambiguation)